PWM may refer to:

Science and technology
 Position weight matrix, a representation in motifs in biological sequences
 Pulse-width modulation, a technique for controlling the average power delivered by an electrical signal
 PWM (window manager), a Unix-based X window manager

Other uses
 Panzerwurfmine, a type of German anti-tank hand grenade
 Portland International Jetport, an airport in the U.S.
 Professional Wealth Management, a financial magazine
 Permanent Way Machine, the British Rail Class 97/6 locomotives
 Polskie Wydawnictwo Muzyczne, the Polish Music Publishing House